Upasana Roy Chowdhury (better known as Upasana RC) is an Indian actress who works in the Tamil film industry.

Biography
She graduated in software engineering from Bangalore. She participated in Elite Miss India, and won the title of Elite Miss India Asia.

Upasana made her debut Enbathettu in 2017. She has starred in Tamil movies which include 88, Brahma.com, Traffic Ramaswamy and Karuthukalai Pathivu Sei.

She participated in the reality show Villa To Village and was the second-runner up.

She acted in Sony Entertainment show Mere Sai - Shraddha Aur Saburi.

Filmography

Films

Television

References

Living people
Indian film actresses
Actresses in Tamil cinema
Year of birth missing (living people)